The discography of American rapper Big Freedia consists of one studio album, four mixtapes, seven extended plays, and 36 singles (including 36 as a featured artist), and 25 music videos

Studio albums

Mixtapes

Extended plays

Singles

As lead artist

As featured artist

Guest appearances

Music videos

References

Hip hop discographies
Discographies of American artists